Leonard Ray Dawson (June 20, 1935 – August 24, 2022) was an American football quarterback who played in the National Football League (NFL) and American Football League (AFL) for 19 seasons, primarily with the Kansas City Chiefs franchise. After playing college football at Purdue, Dawson began his professional career with the NFL in 1957, spending three seasons with the Pittsburgh Steelers and two with the Cleveland Browns. He left the NFL in 1962 to sign with the AFL's Chiefs (then known as the Dallas Texans), where he spent the last 14 seasons of his career, and rejoined the NFL after the AFL–NFL merger.

In the AFL, Dawson led the league in completion percentage seven times, passer rating six times, and passing touchdowns four times. He was named Most Valuable Player (MVP) in 1962 and selected to six AFL All-Star games. Dawson also guided the Chiefs franchise to three AFL championships and the franchise's first Super Bowl title in Super Bowl IV, of which he was named MVP. He retired from professional football after the 1975 season and later served as the sports director at KMBC-TV in Kansas City and color analyst for the Chiefs Radio Network. His demeanor and style earned him the nickname "Lenny The Cool" from his teammates.

Dawson holds the Chiefs franchise records for career passing yards, passing touchdowns, and wins, in addition to holding the franchise record for single-season passing touchdowns from 1964 to 2018. He was inducted into the Pro Football Hall of Fame in 1987.

Early life
Dawson was the ninth of 11 children of Ohio native James and England-born Annie Dawson. He attended Alliance High School in Alliance, Ohio. He was MVP of the football team and was named outstanding Ohio back of the year by the International News Service. A three-sport athlete, Dawson set school records in football and in basketball, and was the first athlete in 13 years to be named first-team all-state in both sports during the same year.

College career

During the recruiting process, Dawson had to choose between Ohio State University in Columbus and Purdue University in Indiana. While he was reluctant to take over Woody Hayes' split-T offense with the Buckeyes, the true reason he selected Purdue stemmed from the rapport he had established with assistant coach Hank Stram, beginning a friendship that would last for more than a half-century.

As a sophomore in 1954, Dawson's first as the Boilermakers' quarterback, he was the NCAA's leader in pass efficiency, while also playing defense and serving as the team's kicker. Behind a strong offensive line, he threw four touchdown passes in a 31–0 victory over Missouri, then later engineered a huge upset of Notre Dame, which had entered the contest on a 13-game winning streak.

During three seasons (1954–1956) with the Boilermakers, Dawson threw for 3,325 yards and 29 touchdowns, leading the Big Ten Conference in that category during each year.  He was named All-American (3rd Team) during the 1956 season.  He was an All-Big Ten Quarterback during the 1955 and 1956 seasons.

While at Purdue, Dawson was initiated into the Alpha Tau Omega fraternity.

Professional career

Pittsburgh Steelers
Dawson was the fifth overall selection in the 1957 NFL Draft, taken by the Pittsburgh Steelers, but he was unable to make an impact. Following his rookie season in 1957, his status became more tenuous when the Steelers acquired future Hall of Famer Bobby Layne early in the 1958 season.

Cleveland Browns
Dawson was traded to the Cleveland Browns on December 31, 1959. However, after encountering similar problems in battling Browns quarterback Milt Plum, Dawson was released after the 1961 season, having completed only 21 passes for 204 yards and two touchdowns in his five seasons of NFL play.

Dallas Texans/Kansas City Chiefs
Dawson signed with the American Football League's Dallas Texans on June 30, 1962. The move reunited him with Stram, who was beginning his third year as the Texans' head coach.

In 1962, Dawson led the league in touchdowns and yards per attempt, and was the Sporting News selection as the AFL MVP. He also led Dallas to the first of three league titles in a thrilling double-overtime victory over the two-time defending champion Oilers in Houston. Dawson ran a ball-control offense in the 20–17 win, and tossed a 28-yard touchdown pass to halfback Abner Haynes.

The team moved north to Kansas City and was renamed to the Chiefs in 1963.

A pinpoint passer, Dawson's mobility helped him flourish in Stram's "moving pocket" offense. He would win four AFL passing titles and was selected as a league All-Star six times, ending the 10-year run of the league as its highest-rated career passer. From 1962 to 1969, Dawson threw more touchdown passes (182) than any other professional football quarterback. In 1966, Dawson led the Chiefs to an 11–2–1 record and a 31–7 win over the Buffalo Bills in the AFL Championship Game, earning his team the honor of representing the AFL in Super Bowl I, the first championship game between the AFL and their NFL rivals. The NFL champion Green Bay Packers won easily, 35–10, but Dawson performed fairly well, completing 16 of 27 passes for 210 yards and one touchdown, with one interception. Dawson was selected by his peers as a Sporting News 1966 AFL All-League player.

Though he threw for more than 2,000 yards in each of the previous seven campaigns, Dawson's 1969 season with Kansas City would be his most memorable because of his dramatic comeback from a knee injury suffered in the season's second game. The injury was at first feared to be season-ending, but after missing five games, Dawson went on to lead the Chiefs to road playoff victories over both the defending Super Bowl champion New York Jets and the Oakland Raiders. He then capped his year with MVP accolades in Super Bowl IV, the last game ever played by an American Football League team. In the game, Dawson paced the Chiefs to a win over the NFL's heavily favored Minnesota Vikings by completing 12 of 17 passes for 142 yards and a touchdown, with one interception, and rushing for 11 yards. The performance was especially notable given that Dawson had been mistakenly linked to a gambling scandal (by an unrelated gentleman who was named Donald Dawson) in the days leading up to the game.

On November 1, 1970, the Chiefs led the Oakland Raiders 17–14 late in the fourth quarter. Facing third and long, a run by Dawson apparently sealed victory for the Chiefs, but as Dawson lay on the ground, he was speared by Raiders' defensive end Ben Davidson, who dove into Dawson with his helmet, provoking Chiefs' receiver Otis Taylor to attack Davidson. After a bench-clearing brawl, offsetting penalties were called, nullifying the first down under the rules in effect at that time. The Chiefs were obliged to punt, and the Raiders tied the game on a George Blanda field goal with eight seconds to play. Taylor's retaliation against Davidson not only cost the Chiefs a win, but Oakland won the AFC West with a season record of 8–4–2, while Kansas City finished 7–5–2 and out of the playoffs.

Retirement
Dawson announced his retirement in May 1976, shortly before turning 41. Dawson ended his career in 1975, having completed 2,136 of 3,741 passes for 28,711 yards and 239 touchdowns, with 181 interceptions. He also gained 1,293 rushing yards and nine rushing touchdowns in his career.

After professional football

In 1966, while still playing for the Chiefs, Dawson became sports director at KMBC-TV in Kansas City. On March 16, 2009, Dawson announced he would step down from anchoring on a nightly basis but would still report for KMBC during the Chiefs football season and would fill in when other anchors were on leave.

From 1977 to 2001, Dawson hosted HBO's Inside the NFL. He also worked as an analyst for NBC's AFC coverage from 1977 to 1982. From 1985 to 2017, Dawson was the color analyst for the Chiefs' radio broadcast team. In 2012, Dawson was honored with the Pete Rozelle Radio-Television Award presented by the Pro Football Hall of Fame for his longtime contributions as a sports broadcaster. At the beginning of his final season as the Chiefs radio analyst, the Chiefs named their broadcast booth at Arrowhead Stadium after Dawson.

In 1979, Dawson was enshrined in the Kansas City Chiefs Hall of Fame, followed by induction into the Pro Football Hall of Fame in 1987 and Purdue's Intercollegiate Athletics Hall of Fame in 1996. In 2008, he was awarded the Walter Camp Distinguished American Award.

In 2006, Dawson was interviewed for the NFL Network documentary America's Game: The Super Bowl Champions chronicling the 1969 Kansas City Chiefs season.

Dawson teamed with Depend in 1998 to encourage men to visit their doctors and to be screened for prostate cancer.

Personal life and death
Dawson was the seventh son of a seventh son, born the ninth of 11 children overall. He was married to his high school sweetheart from 1954 until her death in 1978. He had two children. He later remarried and remained married until his death.

In 1991, Dawson was diagnosed with prostate cancer.

On August 12, 2022, Dawson's family announced that he had entered hospice care at the University of Kansas Medical Center in Kansas City, Kansas. He died on August 24, at the age of 87.

The Chiefs wore a decal with the number 16 on their helmets for the entire 2022 season in honor of Dawson. Before the Chiefs first offensive play of the preseason game the day after his death, the Chiefs lined in huddle popularized by Dawson where the quarterback stands in front of all other 10 offensive players instead of the quarterback standing in the middle with the players making a circle around him.

Career statistics

See also
 List of NCAA major college football yearly passing leaders
 List of American Football League players
 List of Super Bowl MVPs
 List of Super Bowl starting quarterbacks

References

External links

 

1935 births
2022 deaths
American Conference Pro Bowl players
American Football League All-League players
American Football League All-Star players
American Football League All-Time Team
American Football League Most Valuable Players
American Football League players
American football quarterbacks
American people of English descent
American television sports announcers
Cleveland Browns players
College football announcers
Dallas Texans (AFL) players
Kansas City Chiefs announcers
Kansas City Chiefs players
National Football League announcers
National Football League players with retired numbers
People from Alliance, Ohio
Pete Rozelle Radio-Television Award recipients
Pittsburgh Steelers players
Players of American football from Ohio
Pro Football Hall of Fame inductees
Purdue Boilermakers football players
Sportspeople from the Kansas City metropolitan area
Super Bowl MVPs